Vic DiCara is a krishnacore guitarist, vocalist and bass guitarist. He played in Beyond, Inside Out, Shelter, Burn, and later the Hare Krishna band 108. As part of the band 108, DiCara was instrumental in recording three albums considered influential in the hardcore punk scene of the 1990s. DiCara is also noted for the incorporation of Hindu spirituality into his music.

Discography

with Beyond
 No Longer at Ease 1989 (Combined Effort)
reissued w/ bonus material in 1999 by (Some Records)

with Inside Out
No Spiritual Surrender 1990 (Revelation Records)

with 108
 Holyname 1994 (Equal Vision Records)
 Songs of Separation 1995 (Equal Vision Records)
 N.Y.H.C. Documentary Soundtrack 1996 (SFT Records)
 Threefold Misery 1996 (Lost & Found Records)
 One Path For Me Through Destiny 1997 (Caroline) - live album recorded in 1996
 Creation. Sustenance. Destruction. 2006 (Equal Vision Records)
 Oneoeight Demo 2006 (self released)
 A New Beat from a Dead Heart 2007 (Deathwish Inc.)
 18.61 2010 (Deathwish Inc.)

with Burn
 Cleanse 2001 (Equal Vision Records)

References

External links
 - Vic DiCara's official website
108 Official website
[ 108] at Allmusic

American Hindus
American rock guitarists
American male guitarists
Converts to Hinduism
Living people
Performers of Hindu music
Year of birth missing (living people)
American Hare Krishnas
American punk rock guitarists